A City Called Heaven is an album by trumpeter Donald Byrd featuring performances recorded in 1991 and released on the Landmark label.

Reception

The AllMusic reviewer concluded: "Not a bad record, though not as unforgettable as his stuff from over two decades before." The Penguin Guide to Jazz wrote: "Hutcherson continues his Indian summer in the studios with swarming, harmonically dense lines and Henderson's profoundly cast solos evince all the great maturity which seems to have eluded Byrd".

Track listing
All compositions by Donald Byrd except where noted.
 "King Arthur" – 8:26	
 "I'll Always Remember" – 9:38
 "A City Called Heaven" (Traditional) – 10:30	
 "Buck Down in Lu Easy Anna" (Donald Brown) – 6:49	
 "Byrd Song" (James Williams) – 6:01	
 "Del Valle" (Bobby Hutcherson) – 7:20
 "Remember Me" (Henry Purcell) – 5:28
 "Not Necessarily the Blues" – 7:10

Personnel
Donald Byrd – trumpet, flugelhorn
Joe Henderson – tenor saxophone
Bobby Hutcherson – vibraphone
Donald Brown – piano
Rufus Reid – bass
Carl Allen – drums
Lorice Stevens – vocals (tracks 3 & 7)

References

1991 albums
Donald Byrd albums
Albums produced by Orrin Keepnews
Landmark Records albums